Tupou is a common surname in Tonga. It may refer to:
Anthony Tupou, Australian Rugby League player
Bill Tupou, New Zealand Rugby League player
Daniel Tupou, Australian Rugby League player
Fenuki Tupou, American football offensive lineman
Josh Tupou, American football defensive lineman
Tame Tupou, New Zealand rugby league footballer
Tani Tupou, American football player
Taniela Tupou, Australian Rugby Union player
Will Tupou, New Zealand professional rugby footballer
Willie Tupou, Australian rugby league footballer
 Several kings and queens of Tonga
 George Tupou I
 George Tupou II
 Sālote Tupou III
 Tāufaʻāhau Tupou IV
 George Tupou V
 ʻAhoʻeitu Tupou VI

Surnames of Tongan origin
Tongan-language surnames